Roszków may refer to the following places in Poland:

 Roszków, Greater Poland Voivodeship
 Roszków, Silesian Voivodeship